Kumarapala was the successor to the Pala king Ramapala in the Bengal region of the Indian subcontinent, and sixteenth ruler of the Pala line reigning for 10 years. During his reign he put down an uprising in Kamarupa by the governor  Timgyadeva, eventually replacing him with Vaidyadeva (who would rebel four years after the death of Kumarapala). He was succeeded by his son Gopala IV, who ascended the throne as a child..

See also
List of rulers of Bengal

References

Sircar, D. C. The Bhauma-Naraka or the Pala Dynasty of Brahmapala, The Comprehensive History of Assam, ed H. K. Barpujari, Guwahati, 1990.

Year of birth missing
1140 deaths
Pala kings